This is a list of English words of Hebrew origin. Transliterated pronunciations not found in Merriam-Webster or the American Heritage Dictionary follow Sephardic/Modern Israeli pronunciations as opposed to Ashkenazi pronunciations, with the major difference being that the letter taw (ת) is transliterated as a 't' as opposed to an 's'.

There is a separate list of English words of Semitic origin other than those solely of Hebrew or Arabic origin.

From Hebrew words 
 abacus   from אבק avaq 'dust' (AHD), probably from Greek ἄβαξ abax 'slab' (MW)
 agora (currency)  from (AHD) אגורה agorah 'small coin' (MW), from Greek agora "an assembly of the People" from ageirein "to assemble
 aliyah  from (AHD) עלייה aliyah 'ascent' (MW)
 almemar  from אלממר almemar 'bema', from Arabic المنبر al-minbar 'pulpit' (AHD)
 amen  from אמן amen (MW) 'certainly', 'verily' (AHD)
 baal  from בעל ba'al 'lord' (AHD, MW)
 babel  from (AHD, MW) בלל balal 'confound' (SC) + in part from Akkadian 𒇷𒄿 𒀊𒁀 bāb-ilu 'gate of god' (MW)
bar mitzvah from (AHD) בר מצוה bar miṣwah 'son of the commandment' (MW)
bath (volume) from בַּת bath (MW) '10 gallons liquid measure' (AHD)from Greek βαθύς (bathus), "deep",
bat mitzvah from (AHD) בת מצוה bath miṣwah 'daughter of the commandment' (MW)
behemoth from (MW) בהמות behemoth 'beasts' (AHD)
bethel from (AHD) ביתאל beth'el 'house of God' (MW)
bethesda (chapel) (OSPD) from (AHD) Greek Bethesda 'Bethesda' (WNW), probably from bayith chesed 'house of kindness' (SC)
bris from (WNW) ברית b'rith 'covenant' (MW)
brith milah from (WNW) b'rith milah 'covenant of circumcision' (MW)
brouhaha perhaps from barukh hab-ba 'blessed be he who comes' (WNW)
cab (volume) from (MW) qab 'hollow vessel' (AHD)
cabal from (AHD) קַבָּלָה qabbalah 'received (lore)' (MW)
challah from (AHD) חלה ḥallah 'egg-rich yeast-leavened bread' (MW)
chazan, hazan from חזן ḥazzan 'cantor' (MW) + in part from Aramaic, both from Akkadian (AHD)
cherub from (AHD) כרוב kerubh 'celestial hierarchy angel' (MW)
chutzpah from (AHD) חֻצְפָּה ḥuṣpah 'supreme self-confidence' (MW)
cider from (AHD) שכר shekhar 'strong drink' (MW)
copacetic disputed (MW) + perhaps from כל בצדק kol beṣedeq 'all with justice' (AHD), or כל בסדר kol beseder ‘all is in order’ (MW)
cor (volume), kor (volume) from kor (AHD, WNW) '100 gallons capacity' (MW)
corban from (AHD) קָרְבָּן qorban 'offering' (MW)
dybbuk from דיבוק dibbuq 'wandering soul' (AHD, MW)
edenic from (WNW) עדן eden 'delight' (AHD)
ephah from (AHD) איפה ephah '1/10 homer dry measure', from Egyptian (MW)
galilee from Latin galilaea (AHD, MW), from גליל galiyl 'circle', 'circuit' (SC)
ganef from (AHD) גנב gannabh 'thief' (MW)
gerah from (MW) גרה gerah 'grain', 'bean' (AHD)
get (divorce document) from גט get 'document of release' (MW)
golem from גולם golem (AHD) 'shapeless mass' (MW)
goy from גוי goy 'nation' (AHD, MW)
gun moll from (AHD) גנב gannabh 'thief' (MW) + from מִרְיָם Miryam (AHD) 'Miriam' (MW, OED) (='rebelliously') (SC) + perhaps from Egyptian (HH)
habdalah from (AHD) habhdalah 'separation' (MW)
haftarah, haphtarah from (MW, WNW) patar 'separate', 'discharge' (AHD)
haggadah from (AHD, MW) heged 'a saying' (WNW)
halacha from הלכה halakhah 'way' (MW)
hallelujah, alleluia from הללויה halleluyah 'praise the ' (AHD, MW)
halutz from hlṣ 'be in the vanguard' (WNW)
hebraize from (MW) עברי ibhri (AHD) 'region across [descendant]' (SC)
heder from חדר heder 'room' (MW)
homer (volume) from (AHD, MW) חמר hamar 'surge up', 'swell up' (WNW), Greek ὅμηρος (hómēros), "hostage"
hora from הוֹרָה horah 'circle dance of Romania and Israel', from Romanian horă (MW), from Turkish hora, perhaps from Greek χορός khoros 'round dance' (AHD)
hosanna from (AHD) hoshi'ah-nna 'save please' (MW)
jubilee from (AHD) יובל yobhel 'ram's horn' (MW)
judas from (MW) יהודה yehuda (AHD) 'celebrated' (SC)
kabbalah, cabala from (AHD) קַבָּלָה qabbalah 'received (lore)' (MW)
kaddish from (AHD, MW) qds 'sanctify' (WNW)
kashrut from (AHD, MW) כשר ksr 'be appropriate' (WNW)
kibbutz from קיבוץ qibbuṣ (MW) 'gathering' (AHD)
kibosh disputed (AHD, MW) + perhaps from כבש kabash 'tread down', 'disregard'
kiddush from (AHD) qiddush 'sanctification' (MW)
klezmer from (AHD) כלי זמר k'ley zemer 'musical instruments' (MW)
knesset (OSPD) from kanas 'assemble' (AHD, WNW)
kosher from (AHD, MW) כשר ksr 'be appropriate' (WNW)
lehayim (OSPD) from l'ḥaim 'to life' (WNW)
leviathan from (AHD) לויתן liwyathan 'sea monster, whale' (MW)
macabre from French (danse) macabre (AHD, MW), probably from Latin (Chorea) Machabaeorum, from מקבת maqqebet 'hammer' (WNW), from נקב naqab 'perforate' (SC)
maftir (OSPD) from maphtir 'one that dismisses' (NI)
mahzor from (AHD) ḥzr 'return' (WNW)
manna from מן man (AHD, MW) (SC)
matzo from (AHD) מצה maṣah 'unleavened bread' (MW)
maven from (AHD) מבין mebhin 'one who is experienced' (MW), 'one who understands' (OED)
mazeltov from (WNW) מזל טוב mazzal tob 'good luck' (AHD)
mazuma from (WNW) מזומן mezumman 'fixed' (AHD)
megillah from (MW, WNW) galal 'roll' (AHD)
menorah from (AHD) מנורה menorah 'candlestick' (MW)
meshuga from (AHD) משוגע meshugga 'crazy' (MW).
messiah from (AHD) משיח mashiaḥ 'anointed' (MW) + in part from Aramaic (AHD) meshiha 'anointed' (MW)
mezuzah from מְזוּזָה mezuzah 'doorpost' (AHD, MW)
midrash from (AHD) מדרש midrash 'exposition', 'explanation' (MW)
mikvah from miqwah 'purification bath' (AHD)
minyan from מִנְיָן minyan 'number', 'count' (MW), from Aramaic (AHD)
mitzvah from (AHD) מצוה miṣwah 'commandment' (MW)
mohel from מוהל mohel 'person qualified to perform circumcision' (WNW)
momser from momser 'bastard' (WNW)
mishpachah from mishpahah 'family', 'clan' (NI)
moshav from (AHD) מוֹשָׁב moshabh 'dwelling' (MW)
nabla probably from nebhel 'harp' (NI)
nachas pleasure, satisfaction, delight; proud enjoyment (usage: I have nachas from you) (from Hebrew נחת pronounced 'nachat') (WNW)
nebel from nebhel 'harp' (NI)
omer from עמר omer (AHD) '1/10 ephah dry capacity' (MW)
parashah from parashah 'explanation' (MW, WNW)
pascal from 'Pascal' (AHD, MW), from פסח pesah 'passover' (AHD, MW, OED)
paschal from פסח על pasah al 'passed over' (AHD, MW, OED)
pharaoh from פרעה par'oh 'ruler of ancient Egypt', from Egyptian (MW) O1:O29 pr-'o 'great house' (AHD)
pharisee from Aramaic (AHD) perisha 'separated', from (MW) פרש parash 'separate' (SC), 'cleave' (WNW)
rabbi from (AHD, WNW) רב rabh 'master' (MW)
rebbe from (AHD, WNW) רב rabh 'master' (MW)
rebbetzin from (WNW) רב rabh 'master' (MW)
sabbatical from (MW) שׁבת shabbat 'day of rest' (AHD)
sabra from (AHD) ṣabar 'prickly pear' (MW)
satanic from שטן satan 'adversary' (MW), 'devil' (AHD)
schmooze from (AHD) שמועות shemu'oth 'news', 'rumor' (MW)
schwa from שוא schewa 'unstressed mid-central vowel' (MW), probably from Syriac ܥܗܘܐܝܝܐ sewayya 'equal' (AHD)
seder from (AHD) סדר seder 'order' (MW)
selah from (AHD) סֶלָה selah (MW) 'suspension', 'pause' (SC)
seraph from (MW) שׂרף saraph 'celestial being' (AHD)
shadchan (OSPD) from shiddekh 'arrange a marriage' (NI)
shadrach (OSPD) from (AHD) shadrach 'captive' (WNW)
shalom from (AHD) שָׁלוֹם shalom 'peace' (MW)
shalom aleichem from (AHD) שָׁלוֹם עֲלֵיכֶם shalom 'alekhem 'peace unto you' (MW)
shammes from (AHD) שמש shammash 'sexton' (MW)
shamus perhaps from (AHD) שמש shammash 'sexton' (MW)
shegetz from (AHD) שקץ sheqes 'blemish', 'abomination' (MW)
shekel from (MW) שקל saqal 'weigh', from Canaanite tql (AHD)
sheol (OSPD) from se'ol 'underworld' (AHD), perhaps from shaal 'dig' (WNW)
shibboleth from (AHD) שיבולת shibboleth 'stream' (MW), 'ear of grain' (OED)
shiksa from (AHD, WNW) שקץ sheqes 'blemish', 'abomination' (MW)
shivah from (AHD) shibh'ah 'seven' (MW)
shofar from shophar (MW) 'ram's horn' (AHD)
siddur from סידור siddur 'arrangement' (AHD), 'order' (MW)
sukkah from סוכה sukkah 'booth', 'shelter' (MW)
sycamine from (AHD, MW) שִׁקמָה shiqmah 'mulberry tree' (OED)
tallith from (MW) tillel 'cover' (AHD)
talmudism from (MW) lamad 'learn' (AHD)
teraph from (AHD) תרפים teraphim 'household god' (MW)
torah from תּוֹרָה tora 'law', 'instruction' (AHD)
tref from taraph 'tear' (AHD)
tsuris from (AHD) ṣarah 'calamity' (WNW)
tush, toches from (AHD) תחת tahath 'under', 'beneath' (MW)
tzitzit, zizith from (AHD) ציצית ṣiṣith 'fringes', 'tassels' (MW)
ulpan from aleph 'ox', 'leader' (WNW)
yeshiva from (AHD) ישיבה yeshibhah 'talmudic school' (MW)
yid from יהודה yehudah (AHD) 'celebrated' (SC)
zaddik from צדיק ṣaddiq 'just', 'righteous' (MW)

From Hebrew names
 abelia  from 'Abel' (AHD, MW), from הבל Hebhel 'Abel' (='emptiness') (SC)
 abelian  from 'Abel' (AHD, MW), from הבל Hebhel 'Abel' (='emptiness') (SC)
 abigail  from (MW) אֲבִיגַיִל (SC) Avigail 'Abigail' (='father of exaltation') (HH)
 adam-and-eve  from אדם Adam 'Adam' (MW) (='earth') (HH) + from חוה Hawwah 'Eve' (MW) (='living') (HH)
 ammonite from עַמּוֹן Ammon, Biblical tribe
 bedlam  from (AHD, MW) בית לחם Beth Leḥem 'Bethlehem' (='house of bread')
 bejesus  from (AHD) יֵשׁוּעַ Yeshu'a 'Jesus' (MW) (='Jehovah-saved') (SC)
 benday  from (AHD) Binyamin 'Benjamin' (MW) (='son of [the] right hand') (SC) + from Old English (AHD, MW)
 cassia from קסיה qəṣi`â
 davit  from (AHD) דָּוִד Dawid 'David' (MW) (='loving') (SC)
 hamantasch  from Haman 'Haman' (MW) (='vizier') (SC) + from Yiddish (MW)
 jacket  from יַעֲקֹב Ya'aqobh 'Jacob' (MW) (='he has protected') (AHD)
 jacobean  from יַעֲקֹב Ya'aqobh 'Jacob' (MW) (='he has protected') (AHD)
 jacquard  from 'Jacquard' (AHD, MW), from יַעֲקֹב Ya'aqobh 'Jacob' (MW) (='he has protected') (AHD)
 jacquerie  from יַעֲקֹב Ya'aqobh 'Jacob' (MW) (='he has protected') (AHD)
 jakes  perhaps from יַעֲקֹב Ya'aqobh 'Jacob' (MW) (='he has protected') (AHD)
 jeez  from (AHD) יֵשׁוּעַ Yeshu'a 'Jesus' (MW) (='Jehovah-saved') (SC)
 jehu  from יהוא Yehu 'Jehu' (MW) (='Jehovah [is] He') (SC)
 jeremiad  from (AHD) יִרְמְיָה Yirmeyah 'Jeremiah' (MW) (='the  will rise') (SC)
 jeroboam  from (AHD, MW) יָרָבְעָם Yarobh'am 'Jeroboam' (='people will contend') (SC)
 jesuit  from יֵשׁוּעַ Yeshu'a 'Jesus' (AHD) ('Jehovah-saved') (SC)
 jezebel  from (AHD) איזבל Izebhel 'Jezebel' (MW) (='chaste') (SC)
 jimmy  from (MW) 'James' (AHD), from יַעֲקֹב Ya'aqobh 'Jacob' (MW, OED) (='he has protected') (AHD)
 joe  from יוֹסֵף Yoseph 'Joseph' (MW) (='he shall add') (HH)
 jorum  perhaps from (AHD, MW) Yehoram 'Joram' (='Jehovah-raised') (SC)
 joseph  from (AHD) יוֹסֵף Yoseph 'Joseph' (MW) (='he shall add') (HH)
 lazar  from (AHD) אלעזר El'azar 'Lazarus' (MW) (='God is my help') (HH)
 lazaretto  from (AHD) אלעזר El'azar 'Lazarus' (MW) (='God is my help') (HH) + from (MW) נָצְרַת natzerath 'Nazareth' (WNW)
 macadam  from 'McAdam' (MW), in part from Adham 'Adam' (='earth') (HH)
 macadamia  from 'Macadam' (MW), in part from Adham 'Adam' (='earth') (HH)
 marionette  from מִרְיָם Miryam (AHD) 'Miriam' (MW, OED) (='rebelliously') (SC) + perhaps from Egyptian (HH)
 marry (interjection)  from מִרְיָם Miryam (AHD) 'Miriam' (MW, OED) (='rebelliously') (SC) + perhaps from Egyptian (HH)
 mick  from Mikha'el 'Michael' (MW) (='who [is] like God?') (SC)
 mickey (drink)  perhaps from (AHD) Mikha'el 'Michael' (MW) (='who [is] like God?') (SC)
 miquelet  probably from Catalan Miquel (NI), from Mikha'el 'Michael' (MW) (='who [is] like God?') (SC)
 moll  from מִרְיָם Miryam (AHD) 'Miriam' (MW, OED) (='rebelliously') (SC) + perhaps from Egyptian (HH)
 nance  from 'Nancy' (MW, AHD), probably in part from חנה Ḥannah 'Anna' (OED) (='favored') (HH, SC)
 nimrod  from (AHD) נמרוד Nimrodh 'Nimrod' (='hunter') (MW)
 philistine  1 from פלשתים Pelistim 'Philistines' 'Aegean people who settled Philistia' (AHD)2 from (MW) פלשת Pelesheth 'Philistia' (='rolling', 'migratory') (SC)
 rube  (AHD) from רְאוּבֵן Re'ubhen 'Reuben' (MW) (='see ye a son') (SC)
 samaritan  from (AHD, MW) שֹׁמְרוֹן Shomron 'Samaria' (='watch-station') (SC)
 semitist  from שם Shem 'Shem' (MW) (='name') (SC)
 simony  from (AHD) שִׁמְעוֹן Shim'on 'Simon' (MW) (='hearing') (HH, SC)
 sodom  from (MW) סדום s'dom 'Sodom' (AHD, OED) (='burnt') (SC)
 toby  from (AHD, MW) טוביה Toviah 'Tobias' (='goodness of Jehovah') (SC)

Letter names
aleph, beth, gimel, daleth, he, waw, zayin, heth, teth, yod, kaph, lamed, mem, nun, samekh, ayin, pe, sadhe, qoph, resh, shin, taw (AHD, MW, WNW)
 alpha  from Greek Άλφα alpha, perhaps from אלף aleph 'ox', 'leader' (WNW) + from Canaanite 𐤀𐤋𐤐 'alp 'ox' (AHD)
 beta  from Greek Βήτα beta, from בית bet 'house', probably from Phoenician (WNW) + from Canaanite 𐤁𐤉𐤕 bet 'house' (AHD)
 gamma  from Greek Γάμμα gamma, perhaps from גמל gimel 'ruminant beast' (WNW) + from Phoenician 𐤋𐤌𐤀𐤂 (AHD)
 delta  from Greek Δέλτα delta (AHD), perhaps from דלת deleth 'door' (WNW) + of Semitic origin, akin to Phoenician 𐤕𐤋𐤀𐤃 dalt 'door' (AHD)
 eta  from Greek eta, perhaps from chet (WNW) 'terror' (SC) + from (MW) Phoenician 𐤕𐤇 (AHD)
 iota  from Greek Ιώτα iota, perhaps from יד yodh 'hand' (WNW) + from (MW) Phoenician  𐤕𐤏𐤉 (AHD)
 kappa  from Greek Κάππα kappa, perhaps from כף kaph (WNW) 'palm of the hand' (MW) + from (MW) Phoenician 𐤅𐤀𐤊 (AHD)
 lambda  from Greek Λάμβδα lambda, perhaps from למד lamedh 'whip', 'club' (WNW) + from (MW) Phoenician 𐤃𐤌𐤀𐤋 (AHD)
 nu  from Greek Νυ nu, perhaps from נון nun 'fish' (WNW) + of Semitic origin (AHD)
 pi  from Greek Πι pi, perhaps from פה pe 'mouth' (WNW) + from (MW) Phoenician 𐤄𐤐 (AHD)
 rho  from Greek Ρω rho, perhaps from ראש rosh 'head' (WNW) + from (MW) Phoenician 𐤔𐤏𐤓 (AHD)
 tau  from Greek Ταυ tau, perhaps from taw (WNW) 'mark', 'cross' (MW) + from (MW) Phoenician 𐤅𐤀𐤕 (AHD)

See also
Lists of English words of international origin
List of English words of Yiddish origin
Hebraism

References
AHD: American Heritage Dictionary of the English Language: 3rd or 4th edition
HH: A Dictionary of First Names, Patrick Hanks & Flavia Hodges
MW: Merriam-Webster's Collegiate Dictionary: 10th or 11th edition
NI: Webster's New International Dictionary: 2nd or 3rd edition
OED: Oxford English Dictionary: online edition
SC: Strong's Concordance
WNW: Webster's New World Dictionary: 3rd edition
=: a name from a word or phrase with the meaning given

Hebrew
Hebrew